A corvette is a small warship. It is traditionally the smallest class of vessel considered to be a proper (or "rated") warship. The warship class above the corvette is that of the frigate, while the class below was historically that of the sloop-of-war. 

The modern roles that a corvette fulfills include coastal patrol craft, missile boat and fast attack craft. These corvettes are typically between 500 and 2,000 tons. Recent designs of corvettes may approach 3,000 tons and include a hangar to accommodate a helicopter, having size and capabilities that overlap with smaller frigates. However unlike contemporary frigates, a modern corvette does not have sufficient endurance nor seaworthiness for long voyages.

The word "corvette" is first found in Middle French, a diminutive of the Dutch word corf, meaning a "basket", from the Latin corbis.

The rank "corvette captain", equivalent in many navies to "lieutenant commander", derives from the name of this type of ship. The rank is the most junior of three "captain" ranks in several European (e.g., France, Spain, Italy, Croatia) and South American (e.g., Argentina, Chile, Brazil, Colombia) navies, because a corvette, as the smallest class of rated warship, was traditionally the smallest class of vessel entitled to a commander of a "captain" rank.

Sailing vessels

During the Age of Sail, corvettes were one of many types of warships smaller than a frigate and with a single deck of guns. They were very closely related to sloops-of-war. The role of the corvette consisted mostly of coastal patrol, fighting minor wars, supporting large fleets, or participating in show-the-flag missions. The English  Navy began using small ships in the 1650s, but described them as sloops rather than corvettes. The first reference to a corvette was with the French Navy in the 1670s, which may be where the term originated. The French Navy's corvettes grew over the decades and by the 1780s they were ships of 20 guns or so, approximately equivalent to the British Navy's post ships. The British Navy did not adopt the term until the 1830s, long after the Napoleonic Wars, to describe a small sixth-rate vessel somewhat larger than a sloop.

The last vessel lost by France during the American Revolutionary War was the corvette Le Dragon, scuttled by her captain to avoid capture off Monte Cristi, Haïti in January 1783.

They carried four to eight smaller guns on single decks.

Steam ships

Ships during the steam era became much faster and more maneuverable than their sail ancestors. Corvettes during this era were typically used alongside gunboats during colonial missions. Battleships and other large vessels were unnecessary when fighting the indigenous people of the Far East and Africa.

World War II

The modern corvette appeared during World War II as an easily-built patrol and convoy escort vessel. The British naval designer William Reed drew up a small ship based on the single-shaft Smiths Dock Company whale catcher , whose simple design and mercantile construction standards lent itself to rapid production in large numbers in small yards unused to naval work. First Lord of the Admiralty Winston Churchill, later Prime Minister, had a hand in reviving the name "corvette".

The Tribals were so much larger than and sufficiently different from other British destroyers that some consideration was given to resurrecting the classification of "corvette" and applying it to them.

(Royal Navy ships were named after flowers, and ships in Royal Canadian Navy service took the name of smaller Canadian cities and towns.) Their chief duty was to protect convoys throughout the Battle of the Atlantic and on the routes from the UK to Murmansk carrying supplies to the Soviet Union.

The Flower-class corvette was originally designed for offshore patrol work, and was not ideal when pressed into service as an antisubmarine escort. It was shorter than ideal for oceangoing convoy escort work, too lightly armed for antiaircraft defense, and the ships were barely faster than the merchantmen they escorted. This was a particular problem given the faster German U-boat designs then emerging. Nonetheless, the ship was quite seaworthy and maneuverable, but living conditions for ocean voyages were challenging. As a result of these shortcomings, the corvette was superseded in the Royal Navy as the escort ship of choice by the frigate, which was larger, faster, better armed, and had two shafts.

The Royal Australian Navy built 60 s, including 20 for the Royal Navy crewed by Australians, and four for the Indian Navy. These were officially described as Australian minesweepers, or as minesweeping sloops by the Royal Navy, and were named after Australian towns.

Modern corvettes
Modern navies began a trend in the late 20th and early 21st centuries of building corvettes geared towards smaller more manoeuvrable surface capability. They are usually armed with medium- and small-calibre guns, surface-to-surface missiles, surface-to-air missiles (SAM), and anti-submarine weapons. Many can accommodate a small or medium anti-submarine warfare helicopter, with the larger ones also having a hangar. While the size and capabilities of the largest corvettes overlap with smaller frigates, corvettes are designed primarily for littoral deployment while frigates are ocean-going vessels by virtue of their greater endurance and seaworthiness.

Most countries with coastlines can build corvette-sized ships, either as part of their commercial shipbuilding activities or in purpose-built yards, but the sensors, weapons, and other systems required for a surface combatant are more specialized and are around 60% of the total cost.  These components are purchased on the international market.

Current corvette classes

Many countries today operate corvettes. Countries that border smaller seas, such as the Baltic Sea or the Persian Gulf, are more likely to build the smaller and more manoeuvrable corvettes, with Russia operating the most corvettes in the world.

In the 1960s, the Portuguese Navy designed the s as multi-role small frigates intended to be affordable for a small navy. The João Coutinho class soon inspired a series of similar projects – including the Spanish , the German MEKO 140, the French A69 and the Portuguese  – adopted by a number of medium- and small-sized navies.

The first operational corvette based on stealth technology was the Royal Norwegian Navy's . The Swedish Navy introduced the similarly stealthy .

The United States is developing littoral combat ships, which are essentially large corvettes, their spacious hulls permitting space for mission modules, allowing them to undertake tasks formerly assigned to specialist classes such as minesweepers or the anti-submarine .

The Israeli Navy operates three s. Built in the U.S. to an Israeli design, they each carry one helicopter and are well-armed with offensive and defensive weapons systems, including the Barak 8 SAM, and advanced electronic sensors and countermeasures. They displace over 1,200 tons at full load.

The Indian Navy operates four s built by Garden Reach Shipbuilders and Engineers. All of them were in service by 2017.

The new German Navy  is designed to replace Germany's fast attack craft and also incorporates stealth technology and land attack capabilities. The Israeli Navy has ordered four s, a more heavily armed version of the type, deliveries commenced in 2019.

Turkey began to build MİLGEM-class corvettes in 2005. The MİLGEM class is designed for anti-submarine warfare and littoral patrol duty. The lead ship, TCG Heybeliada, entered navy service in 2011.

The corvettes will have helicopter carrying, mine laying, ice breaking, anti-aircraft and anti-ship abilities.

The Greek Navy has categorised the class as fast attack missile craft. A similar vessel is the  fast attack missile craft of the Turkish Navy, which is classified as a corvette by Lürssen Werft, the German ship designer.

In 2004, to replace the Ardhana class patrol boat, the United Arab Emirates Ministry of Defence awarded a contract to Abu Dhabi Ship Building for the Baynunah class of corvettes. This class is based on the CMN Group's Combattante BR70 design. The Baynunah class is designed for patrol and surveillance, minelaying, interception and other anti-surface warfare operations in the United Arab Emirates territorial waters and exclusive economic zone. The lead ship was launched on June 25, 2009. Sea trials commenced in January 2010.

Operators

  operates four s and three s.
  operates six s and three s.
  operates four Jiangdao-class corvettes ordered from China, and two modified s, purchased from the United Kingdom, which was upgraded to guided-missile corvettes.
  operates four s purchased from Italy.
  operates two s, and one Barroso-class corvette.
  operates two s and a single .
  operates 72 Jiangdao-class corvettes.
  operates two s and eleven Ching Chiang-class corvettes.
  operates a single  and a single , both purchased from South Korea.
  operates a single .
  operates six s.
  operates four s, two s purchased from Spain, and a single  purchased from South Korea.
  operates a single .
  operates six s.
  operates five s.
  operates seven s, three s, four s, one , and four s.
  operates 14 s purchased from Germany after the German reunification, three s, three s, and four s.
  operates three s and four s.
  operates two s and a single .
  operates two s.
  operates four s, two s, and one Amnok-class corvette.
  operates seven s.
  operates a single .
  operates six Kedah-class corvettes, two s, and four s.
  operates three s.
  operates a single .
  operates two Jiangdao-class corvettes, ordered from China.
  operates six s.
  operates three s, and two s.
  operates six s and two s donated from South Korea.
  operates three s purchased from the United Kingdom, two s purchased from South Korea, and a single .
  operates a single  and a single Kaszub-class corvette.
  operates one  and one .
  operates three s, two s, and two s.
  operates 20 s, eight s, 21 s, six s, three s, ten Buyan-M-class corvettes, three s, seven s (classed as frigates by NATO), a single  (also classed as a frigate by NATO), and two Bora-class corvettes.
  operates a single .
  operates two Al Jubail-class corvettes, and four s.
  operates six s.
  operates two s.
  operates five s, two s, and two s.
  operates three s, one , and two s.
  operates five s and four s.
  operates two s and a single .
  operates a single .
  operates six s, two s, and a single .
  operates 12 s, and two s purchased from South Korea.
  operates two s.

Former operators
  decommissioned its last  in 1960.
  returned both its s to the United Kingdom in 1944.
  decommissioned all its s and s in 1945, following World War II.
  decommissioned its last  in 1967.
  decommissioned its last  in 2009.
  decommissioned its last  in 1979.
  decommissioned its last Turunmaa-class corvette in 2002.
  sold all of its 16 s to Indonesia in 1992.
  decommissioned its two s in 1995.
  decommissioned its last  in 1952.
  decommissioned its two s in 2022.
  decommissioned its last  in 2019.
  decommissioned both its s in 2009.
  decommissioned its last  in 1958.
  decommissioned both its s in 1948.
  decommissioned its lone  in 1967.
  decommissioned its last  in 1996.
  last  Vinnytsia was sunk in Ochakiv in 2022. 
  decommissioned all its s in 1945 following World War II.
  decommissioned its lone  in 1975.
  decommissioned its last  in 1962.
  returned its lone  to the United Kingdom in 1949.

Future development

  will receive three s from Russia and six Jiangdao-class corvettes from China.
  is planning to build 11 more s.
  is will commission three more Gowind-class corvettes.
  is currently planning to build four s.
  is a partner nation in the European Patrol Corvette project.
  is building an additional five s.
  is a partner nation in the European Patrol Corvette project. Greece is also planning on receiving a number of Themistocles-class  corvettes, a variant of the Israeli Sa'ar 72 class. Greece has also ordered three Gowind 2500-class corvettes from France.
  has begun research into its NGC (Next-Gen Corvette) project. (India is also working on 12 Anti Submarine Warfare Corvettes - ASW-SWC corvettes)
  is currently building a single "presidential and guided-missile corvette" named  and planned to be delivered by February 2023. Indonesia has also approved the procurement proposal of up to three s from South Korea.
  is currently building an additional two s. Israel is also planning a number of new s.
  is leading the development of the European Patrol Corvette in a joint project with other European Union partners.
  has ordered four s from Turkey.
  purchased an additional  from South Korea, but is awaiting transfer due to lack of funding. The Philippines have also ordered two new corvettes from Hyundai.
  is building four Doha-class corvettes.
  is a partner nation in the European Patrol Corvette project.
  has ordered four Gowind-class corvettes.
  is currently building corvettes in six separate classes, including: the Karakurt-class, Buyan-M-class, Bykov-class, Steregushchiy-class, Gremyashchiy-class and Derzky-class (the latter three classed as frigates by NATO).
  has ordered an unspecified number of s from Turkey.
  has ordered two Gowind-class corvettes.

Museum ships

 , 1874 steam and sail barque, Buenos Aires, Argentina
 , 1941 , Williamstown, Victoria, Australia
 , 1955 , Porto Velho, Brazil
 , 1955 , Belém, Para, Brazil
 , 1941 , Halifax, Nova Scotia, Canada
 , 1941 , Whyalla, South Australia, Australia
 , 1968  corvette, Turku, Finland
 , 1984  missile corvette, Fall River, Massachusetts, US
 INS Khukri (P49) will be preserved in Diu, India
  in Samut Prakan Province, Thailand.
 Hans Beimler, 1986  in Peenemünde, Germany.

See also
 List of corvette classes
 List of corvette and sloop classes of the Royal Navy
 List of corvettes of the Second World War
 List of Escorteurs of the French Navy
 Corvette 31, a sailboat named in honour of the warship class.

References

Further reading
 The collection Three Corvettes by Nicholas Monsarrat recounts the writer's World War II experiences on corvettes, starting as an inexperienced small-boat sailor and ending as captain.
 The novel The Cruel Sea (1951), also by Nicholas Monsarrat, about the life and death of a Flower-class corvette and the men in her, is regarded as one of the classic naval stories of World War II.
 James B. Lamb's two books, The Corvette Navy and On the Triangle Run, give an autobiographical and historical perspective of life on Royal Canadian Navy corvettes in World War II. The author served on them for six years from Halifax to the beaches of D-Day.

External links

 Watch the 1943 film Corvette Port Arthur at NFB.ca
 

 
Ship types
Naval sailing ship types